Pioneer Productions is a British television production company based in London, United Kingdom, specialising in scientific and other documentary productions.

History
Founded in 1988, by Nigel Henbest, Heather Couper and Stuart Carter, Pioneer targeted science broadcasting in a period of global tele-media expansion, and sought relationships with US factual television broadcasters. In the 1990s it produced series entitled Raging Planet, and Extreme Machines. Later CGI films included Journey to the Edge of the Universe, The Unsinkable Titanic,  Extraordinary Animals, In the Womb, and Catastrophe. In 2009 it helped produce the six-part series Christianity: A History for Channel 4.

Awards
Pioneer has won the "Best Science Film" award twice at the Banff World Media Festival, the Grand Award at the New York Television Festival,  a UK Indie award, Sony Award, CINE Golden Eagles, and other prizes in the U.S., France, Italy, and Greece. Recently, Pioneer Productions has won an Emmy Award and awards at the Royal Television Society.

References

Television production companies of the United Kingdom
Mass media companies established in 1988